Felix Davis (10 July 1869 – 1950) was an English professional footballer who played as a full-back.

References

1869 births
1950 deaths
People from Hasland
Footballers from Derbyshire
English footballers
Association football fullbacks
Brampton Works F.C. players
Chesterfield F.C. players
Ilkeston Town F.C. (1945) players
Nottingham Forest F.C. players
Grimsby Town F.C. players
Warmley F.C. players
English Football League players